Brautmystik (IPA /'brautˌmystik/), literally 'bride-mysticism', often rendered 'bridal mysticism' or 'nuptial mysticism' in English, was a thirteenth-century Christian spiritual movement associated with the Low Countries.

It is particularly associated with Beatrice of Nazareth (d. 1268) and Hadewijch of Antwerp (fl. c. 1250). The movement drew inspiration from the thought of Bernard of Clairvaux, particularly his thinking on the imagery of the Canticle. It was a form of affective piety. It is often associated with the more intellectual, speculative movement, .

References

External links
 Don Christopher Nugent, 'The Harvest of Hadewijch: Brautmystik and Wesenmystik', Mystics Quarterly, 12.3 (September 1986), 119–26, https://www.jstor.org/stable/20716745.

Christian mysticism
History of Christianity in Belgium